Benjamin Waterhouse Hawkins (8 February 1807 – 27 January 1894) was an English sculptor and natural history artist renowned for his work on the life-size models of dinosaurs in the Crystal Palace Park in south London. The models, accurately made using the latest scientific knowledge, created a sensation at the time. Hawkins was also a noted lecturer on zoological topics.

Education and early career 
Benjamin Waterhouse Hawkins was born in Bloomsbury, London on 8 February 1807, the son of Thomas Hawkins, an artist, and Louisa Anne Waterhouse, the daughter of a Jamaica plantation family of apparent Catholic sympathies.  He studied at St. Aloysius College, and learned sculpture from William Behnes. At the age of 20, he began to study natural history and later geology. He contributed illustrations to The Zoology of the Voyage of HMS Beagle.  

During the 1840s, he produced studies of living animals in Knowsley Park, near Liverpool for Edward Stanley, 13th Earl of Derby. The park was one of the largest private menageries in Victorian England and Hawkins' work was later published with John Edward Gray's text as "Gleanings from the Menagerie at Knowsley" . Over the same period Hawkins exhibited four sculptures at the Royal Academy between 1847 and 1849, and was elected a member of the Society of Arts in 1846 and a fellow of the Linnean Society in 1847. Fellowship of the Geological Society of London followed in 1854.

Great Exhibition 

Meanwhile, possibly due to Derby's connections, Hawkins was appointed assistant superintendent of the Great Exhibition of 1851 in London. The following year, he was appointed by the Crystal Palace company to create 33 life-size concrete models of extinct dinosaurs to be placed in the south London park to which the great glass exhibition hall was to be relocated. In this work, which took some three years, he collaborated with Sir Richard Owen and other leading scientific figures of the time: Owen estimated the size and overall shape of the animals, leaving Hawkins to sculpt the models according to Owen's directions.

A dinner was held inside the mould used to make the Iguanodon. The dinner party, hosted by Owen on 31 December 1853, garnered attention in the press. Most of the sculptures are still on display in Crystal Palace Park.

United States 

In 1868, he traveled to the United States to deliver a series of lectures. Working with the scientist Joseph Leidy, Hawkins designed and cast an almost complete skeleton of Hadrosaurus foulkii which was then displayed at the Academy of Natural Sciences in Philadelphia. Supported on an iron framework in a lifelike pose, this was the world's first mounted dinosaur skeleton.

Hawkins was later commissioned to produce models for New York City's Central Park museum similar to these he had created in Sydenham. He established a studio on the original site of the American Museum of Natural History in Manhattan, and planned to create a Paleozoic Museum.  During his ten years in America (1868-1878), Hawkins designed exhibit halls for the Smithsonian Institution in Washington, D.C., and began to create an enormous paleontological museum for New York City. The museum was to have been in Central Park. His work was all destroyed in 1871 by "Boss" Tweed, a corrupt politician, who wasn't adequately compensated for his patronage. 

Following the tragic loss of his studio through destruction of all of his dinosaur models at the hands of Tweed's vandals, he returned to England in 1874, but almost immediately returned, doing dinosaur reconstructions at Princeton University (then called the College of New Jersey) in Princeton, New Jersey (where he also created paintings of dinosaurs).  These paintings remain in the collection of the Princeton University Art Museum. Hawkins also worked at the Centennial Exhibition of 1876 in Philadelphia. He again returned to Britain in 1878.

Family and death 
Hawkins had married in 1826 to Mary Selina Green, and by her had several children. In 1835, he met and fell in love with artist Frances 'Louisa' Keenan, and the next year he left his family and bigamously married her. He kept in touch with Mary and her children, but lived with Louisa, having two additional daughters. On his 1874 return to England, he seems to have become estranged from Louisa. He was living with his son by Mary, amidst what he described a "climax of domestic troubles" thought to indicate that Louisa had finally learned that their 38-year marriage had been invalid, and this may have led to his precipitous return to America in 1875.  After his second return, he moved to West Brompton to be near his first wife, Mary, who was ill. Mary died in 1880.  

In 1883, Hawkins again married Louisa, although since they were not cohabitants at the time this was probably done for legalistic reasons (to legitimize their children), and they apparently never reconciled before her death the next year. Hawkins suffered a debilitating stroke in 1889, leading to erroneous reports of his death, and died on 27 January 1894. There is a blue plaque at 22 Belvedere Road ("Fossil Villa") in Upper Norwood, commemorating where he lived between 1856 and 1872.

Legacy 
Robert J. Sawyer's 1994 novel End of an Era mentions the famous New Year's Eve 1853 dinner party inside the Iguanodon, citing both Hawkins and Sir Richard Owen by name.

Works list 
 Comparative anatomy as applied to the purposes of the artist by Benjamin Waterhouse Hawkins and George Wallis. Published by Winsor & Newton, Ltd. [1883] 
 Fauna boreali-americana, or, The zoology of the northern parts of British America : containing descriptions of the objects of natural history collected on the late northern land expeditions under command of Captain Sir John Franklin, R.N. by: Sir John Richardson, Charles M Curtis, Sir John Franklin, Benjamin Waterhouse Hawkins, William Kirby, Thomas Landseer, James de Carle Sowerby, William Swainson, Charles Edward Wagstaff. Published by John Murray (1829-1837) 
 Gleanings from the menagerie and aviary at Knowsley Hall by John Edward Gray, Benjamin Waterhouse Hawkins, Edward Lear. Published by Knowsley [Printed for private distribution] (1846–50) 
 Group of European bison or aurochs sculpture in Bronze Exhibited at Great Exhibition of the Works of Industry of all Nations (London), 1851. Modelled and chased for presentation to H.I.M. the Emperor of Russia, from the Zoological Society of London

Gallery

References

Sources

Further reading 
 Bramwell, Valerie and Peck, Robert M. All in the Bones: A Biography of Benjamin Waterhouse Hawkins. Academy of Natural Sciences, 2008
 Kerley, Barbara.  The Dinosaurs of Waterhouse Hawkins: An Illuminating History of Mr. Waterhouse Hawkins, Artist and Lecturer Illustrated by Brian Selznick. Scholastic Press, 2001.
 Goldman, David. "Benjamin Waterhouse Hawkins and his New York City Paleozoic Museum."  Prehistoric Times Magazine Dec/Jan 2003.
 Yann, Carla. "Benjamin Waterhouse Hawkins" in Dictionary of Nineteenth-Century British Scientists, University of Chicago Press, 2004.

External links 

Benjamin Waterhouse Hawkins Album images from the Academy of Natural Sciences of Drexel University
Benjamin Waterhouse Hawkins and his New York City Paleozoic Museum
"A Buried History of Paleontology," Brian Selznick and David Serlin From Cabinet Magazine Online Issue 28, Winter 2007/08.
 "Divine Intervention, Dinosaurs, and Darwin's Descent" Brian Switek, Wired, 28 June 2011

Fellows of the Linnean Society of London
English sculptors
English male sculptors
English zoologists
Fellows of the Geological Society of London
1807 births
1894 deaths
Paleoartists
19th-century British sculptors